Māngere-Ōtāhuhu Local Board is one of the 21 local boards of the Auckland Council, and is overseen by the council's Manukau ward councillors. The board is governed by seven board members elected at-large. The board's administrative area includes the suburbs Māngere Bridge, Māngere, Ōtāhuhu, and Favona, and covers areas south of the Manukau Harbour.

Demographics

Māngere-Ōtāhuhu Local Board Area had a population of 78,450 at the 2018 New Zealand census, an increase of 7,491 people (10.6%) since the 2013 census, and an increase of 10,296 people (15.1%) since the 2006 census. There were 17,880 households, comprising 38,991 males and 39,459 females, giving a sex ratio of 0.99 males per female. The median age was 29.0 years (compared with 37.4 years nationally), with 20,700 people (26.4%) aged under 15 years, 19,686 (25.1%) aged 15 to 29, 31,419 (40.0%) aged 30 to 64, and 6,645 (8.5%) aged 65 or older.

Ethnicities were 19.1% European/Pākehā, 16.4% Māori, 59.4% Pacific peoples, 19.0% Asian, and 1.3% other ethnicities. People may identify with more than one ethnicity.

The percentage of people born overseas was 39.7, compared with 27.1% nationally.

Although some people chose not to answer the census's question about religious affiliation, 18.9% had no religion, 60.7% were Christian, 1.9% had Māori religious beliefs, 5.7% were Hindu, 5.1% were Muslim, 1.1% were Buddhist and 1.5% had other religions.

Of those at least 15 years old, 6,957 (12.0%) people had a bachelor's or higher degree, and 12,747 (22.1%) people had no formal qualifications. The median income was $24,700, compared with $31,800 nationally. 4,758 people (8.2%) earned over $70,000 compared to 17.2% nationally. The employment status of those at least 15 was that 28,164 (48.8%) people were employed full-time, 6,297 (10.9%) were part-time, and 3,627 (6.3%) were unemployed.

2019–2022 term

The current board members, elected at the 2019 local body elections in October, are:
Tauanu'u Nick Bakulich, Labour – (8044 votes)
Christine O'Brien, Labour – (8015 votes)
Lemauga Lydia Sosene, Labour – (7982 votes)
Anae Neru Leavasa, Labour – (7870 votes)
Walter Togiamua, Labour – (7797 votes)
Harry Fatu Toleafoa, Labour – (7784 votes)
Makalita Kolo, Labour – (6936 votes)

2016–19 term
The board members who served from the 2016 local body elections to the 2019 elections were:
Lemauga Lydia Sosene (Chair) - Labour
Togiatolu Walter Togiamua (Deputy Chair) - Labour
Carol Elliot - Labour
Makalita Kolo - Labour
Tafafuna'i Tasi Lauese - Labour
Christine O'Brien - Labour
Tauanu'u Nick Bakulich - Labour

Notes

References

Local boards of the Auckland Region